Saskatoon Meewasin is a provincial electoral district for the Legislative Assembly of Saskatchewan, Canada. The district includes the neighbourhoods of River Heights, Richmond Heights, City Park, North Park, and Kelsey-Woodlawn.

As of the Canada 2016 Census, the population of the riding was 15,135.

Created for the 16th Saskatchewan general election as "Saskatoon Mayfair" out of part of Saskatoon City, this constituency was redrawn and renamed "Saskatoon River Heights" in 1991.

Ryan Meili resigned in 2022, and a provincial by-election was triggered.

Members of the Legislative Assembly

Election results

2022 by-election 

|-

2020 general election

2017 by-election 

|-

1995–2016

 

 

 

 

 

^ Saskatchewan Party compared to Progressive Conservative

Saskatoon River Heights (1991–1995)

|-

| style="width: 130px" |NDP
|Carol Teichrob
|align="right"|4,908
|align="right"|42.90
|align="right"|-0.90

|Prog. Conservative
|Ray Meiklejohn
|align="right"|3,578
|align="right"|31.27
|align="right"|-14.26

|- bgcolor="white"
!align="left" colspan=3|Total
!align="right"|11,441
!align="right"|100.00
!align="right"|

Saskatoon Mayfair (1967–1991)

|-

| style="width: 130px" |Progressive Conservative
|Ray Meiklejohn
|align="right"|7,725
|align="right"|45.53
|align="right"|-17.11

|NDP
|Gord Gunoff
|align="right"|7,431
|align="right"|43.80
|align="right"|+11.76

|- bgcolor="white"
!align="left" colspan=3|Total
!align="right"|16,966
!align="right"|100.00
!align="right"|

|-

| style="width: 130px" |Progressive Conservative
|Cal Glauser
|align="right"|7,386
|align="right"|62.64
|align="right"|+32.05

|NDP
|Dave Whalley
|align="right"|3,777
|align="right"|32.04
|align="right"|-23.26

|- bgcolor="white"
!align="left" colspan=3|Total
!align="right"|11,790
!align="right"|100.00
!align="right"|

|-

| style="width: 130px" |NDP
|Beverly Dyck
|align="right"|4,328
|align="right"|55.30
|align="right"|+9.61

|Prog. Conservative
|Donna L. Birkmaier
|align="right"|2,394
|align="right"|30.59
|align="right"|+4.22

|- bgcolor="white"
!align="left" colspan=3|Total
!align="right"|7,826
!align="right"|100.00
!align="right"|

|-

| style="width: 130px" |NDP
|Beverly Dyck
|align="right"|3,467
|align="right"|45.69
|align="right"|-22.02

|Prog. Conservative
|June Smith
|align="right"|2,001
|align="right"|26.37
|align="right"|+19.63
|- bgcolor="white"
!align="left" colspan=3|Total
!align="right"|7,588
!align="right"|100.00
!align="right"|

|-

| style="width: 130px" |NDP
|John Edward Brockelbank
|align="right"|8,545
|align="right"|67.71
|align="right"|+14.31

|Prog. Conservative
|Lillian Sonmor
|align="right"|851
|align="right"|6.74
|align="right"|-6.59
|- bgcolor="white"
!align="left" colspan=3|Total
!align="right"|12,620
!align="right"|100.00
!align="right"|

|-

| style="width: 130px" |NDP
|John Edward Brockelbank
|align="right"|5,739
|align="right"|53.40
|align="right"|*

|Prog. Conservative
|Hugh Raney
|align="right"|1,432
|align="right"|13.33
|align="right"|*
|- bgcolor="white"
!align="left" colspan=3|Total
!align="right"|10,747
!align="right"|100.00
!align="right"|

References

External links
Website of the Legislative Assembly of Saskatchewan
Saskatchewan Archives Board – Saskatchewan Election Results By Electoral Division
Map of Saskatoon Meewasin riding as of 2016

Saskatchewan provincial electoral districts
Politics of Saskatoon